This list gives an overview of the classification of minerals (silicates) and includes mostly International Mineralogical Association (IMA) recognized minerals and its groupings. This list complements the List of minerals recognized by the International Mineralogical Association series of articles and List of minerals. Rocks, ores, mineral mixtures, non-IMA approved minerals and non-named minerals are mostly excluded.

Classification of minerals

Introduction 

The grouping of the New Dana Classification and of the mindat.org is similar only, and so this classification is an overview only. Consistency is missing too on the group name endings (group, subgroup, series) between New Dana Classification and mindat.org. Category, class and supergroup name endings are used as layout tools in the list as well.

Abbreviations
 "*" – mineral not IMA-approved.
 "Q" – doubtful/questionable.
 Rn – renaming.
 Rd – redefinition.
 "REE" – rare-earth element (Sc, Y, La, Ce, Pr, Nd, Pm, Sm, Eu, Gd, Tb, Dy, Ho, Er, Tm, Yb, Lu).
 "PGE" – platinum-group element (Ru, Rh, Pd, Os, Ir, Pt).
 "s.p." – special procedure.

Category '9': silicate minerals 
 
 Unclassified silicates

Subclass '9.A': nesosilicates 
 

 Zircon group:  (a group of simple tetragonal silicates where M = tetravalent Zr, Th, or Hf)
 Hafnon , Stetindite , Thorite , Zircon , Coffinite , Thorogummite , IMA2008-035 
 Olivine group
 Calcio-Olivine , Fayalite , Forsterite , Laihunite , Liebenbergite , Olivine , Tephroite 
 Phenakite group
 Phenakite , Willemite , Eucryptite 
 
 Sillimanite subgroup
 Sillimanite , Mullite  (x=0.17 to 0.59), Boromullite 
 Andalusite subgroup
 Andalusite , Kanonaite , Yoderite 
 Kyanite 
 Titanite group
 Titanite , Malayaite , Vanadomalayaite 
 Cerite group
 Cerite-(Ce) , Cerite-(La) , Aluminocerite-(Ce) 
 Silicate apatites
 Ellestadite* , Britholite-(Ce) , Britholite-(Y) , Ellestadite-(F) , Ellestadite-(OH) , Ellestadite-(Cl) , Mattheddleite , Karnasurtite-(Ce)  (?), Fluorbritholite-(Ce) , Fluorcalciobritholite 
 Uranophane group
 Kasolite , Uranophane , Sklodowskite , Cuprosklodowskite , Boltwoodite , Natroboltwoodite , Oursinite , Swamboite , Uranophane-beta 
 Datolite group
 Datolite series
 Datolite , Hingganite-(Ce) , Hingganite-(Y) , Hingganite-(Yb) , Calcybeborosilite-(Y) 
 Homilite series
 Bakerite , Gadolinite-(Ce) , Gadolinite-(Y) , Calciogadolinite? , Homilite , Minasgeraisite-(Y) 
 Hellandite group
 Hellandite-(Y) 
 Tadzhikite-(Y) 
 Tadzhikite-(Ce) 
 Hellandite-(Ce) 
 Mottanaite-(Ce) 
 Ciprianiite 
 Piergorite-(Ce) 
 Vicanite group
 Vicanite-(Ce) 
 Hundholmenite-(Y) 
 Proshchenkoite-(Y)

"Garnet" supergroup 
Nesosilicate insular  groups only with cations in [6] and >[6] coordination
 Garnet group,  (X = Ca, Fe, etc., Z = Al, Cr, etc., T = Si, As, V, etc.)
 Pyralspite series
 Pyrope , Almandine , Spessartine , Knorringite , Majorite , Calderite 
 Ugrandite series
 Andradite , Grossular , Uvarovite , Goldmanite , Yamatoite? 
 Schorlomite – Kimzeyite series
 Schorlomite , Kimzeyite , Morimotoite 
 Hydrogarnet
 Hibschite  (x=0.2 to 1.5), Katoite  (x=1.5 to 3)
 Tetragonal hydrogarnet
 Henritermierite , Holtstamite 
 Bredigite , Merwinite , Wadalite , Rondorfite

"Humite" supergroup 
 Topaz group
 Topaz , Krieselite 
 Humite, general formula 
 Chondrodite series
 Alleghanyite , Chondrodite , Reinhardbraunsite , Ribbeite , Kumtyubeite 
 Humite series
 Humite , Leucophoenicite , Manganhumite , Chegemite 
 Clinohumite series
 Clinohumite , Jerrygibbsite , Sonolite , Hydroxylclinohumite 
Norbergite 
Chloritoid group
 Chloritoid , Magnesiochloritoid , Ottrelite , Carboirite-VIII

Subclass '9.B': sorosilicates 
 

 Epidote supergroup, 
 Epidote group
 Clinozoisite , Niigataite , Epidote , Hancockite , Mukhinite , Piemontite , Piemontite-(Sr) , Tweddillite 
 Allanite group
 Allanite-(Ce) , Allanite-(La) , Allanite-(Y) , Dissakisite-(Ce) , Dissakisite-(La) , Ferriallanite-(Ce) , Manganiandrosite-(Ce) , Manganiandrosite-(La) , Vanadoandrosite-(Ce) 
 Dollaseite group
 Dollaseite-(Ce) , Khristovite-(Ce) , Mills et al. (2009)

Subclass '9.C': cyclosilicates 
 

 Tourmaline group
 Alkali-Deficient Tourmaline subgroup - Foitite subgroup
 Foitite [ ][(Fe2+)2(Al,Fe3+)][Al6][(OH)3|OH|(BO3)3|Si6O18], Magnesiofoitite [ ][Mg2(Al,Fe3+)][Al6][(OH)3|OH|(BO3)3|Si6O18], Rossmanite [ ][LiAl2][Al6][(OH)3|OH|(BO3)3|Si6O18], Oxy-Rossmanite [ ][LiAl2]Al6(OH)3O(BO3)3[Si6O18]
 Calcic Tourmaline subgroup - Liddicoatite subgroup
Liddicoatite [Ca][Li2Al][Al6][(OH)3|F|(BO3)3|Si6O18], Uvite CaMg3(Al5Mg)(Si6O18)(BO3)3(OH)4, Feruvite [Ca][(Fe2+,Mg)3][MgAl5][(OH)3|F|(BO3)3|Si6O18], Hydroxyuvite (IMA2000-030 was not approved, but suspended) CaMg3(Al5Mg)(Si6O18)(BO3)3(OH)3(OH)
 Ferric Tourmaline subgroup - Buergerite subgroup
 Buergerite [Na][(Fe3+)3][Al6][O3|F|(BO3)3|Si6O18], Povondraite [Na][(Fe3+)3][(Fe3+)4Mg2][(OH)3|O|(BO3)3|Si6O18]
 Lithian Tourmaline subgroup - Elbaite subgroup
 Olenite NaAl9B3Si6O27O3OH, Oxy-Dravite Na(MgAl2)(MgAl5)Si6O18(BO3)3(OH)3O, Elbaite Na(Al1.5Li1.5)Al6(OH)3(OH)(BO3)3Si6O18
Sodic Tourmaline subgroup - Schorl subgroup
 Dravite [Na][Mg3][Al6][(OH)3|OH|(BO3)3|Si6O18], Fluor-Dravite NaMg3Al6(OH)3F(BO3)3(Si6O18), Schorl [Na][(Fe2+)3][Al6][(OH)3|OH|(BO3)3|Si6O18], Schorl-(F) [Na][(Fe2+)3][Al6][(OH)3|F,OH|(BO3)3|Si6O18], Chromdravite [Na][Mg3][(Cr3+,Fe3+)6][(OH)3|OH|(BO3)3|Si6O18], Vanadiumdravite [Na][Mg3][(V3+)6][(OH)3|OH|(BO3)3|Si6O18]
 Eudialyte group
 Carbokentbrooksite (Na,[ ])12(Na,Ce)3Ca6Mn3Zr3Nb(Si25O73)(OH)3(CO3)•H2O
 Eudialyte Na4(Ca,Ce)2(Fe2+,Mn,Y)ZrSi8O22(OH,Cl)2 (?)
 Feklichevite Na11Ca9(Fe3+,Fe2+)2Zr3Nb[Si25O73](OH,H2O,Cl,O)5
 Ferrokentbrooksite Na15Ca6(Fe,Mn)3Zr3NbSi25O73(O,OH,H2O)3(Cl,F,OH)2
 Georgbarsanovite Na12(Mn,Sr,REE)3Ca6(Fe2+)3Zr3NbSi25O76Cl2•H2O
 Golyshevite (Na,Ca)10Ca9(Fe3+,Fe2+)2Zr3NbSi25O72(CO3)(OH)3•H2O
 Ikranite (Na,H3O)15(Ca,Mn,REE)6(Fe3+)2Zr3([ ],Zr)([ ],Si)Si24O66(O,OH)6Cl•2-3H2O
 Johnsenite-(Ce) Na12(Ce,REE,Sr)3Ca6Mn3Zr3W(Si25O73)(CO3)(OH,Cl)2
 Kentbrooksite (Na,REE)15(Ca,REE)6Mn2+Zr3NbSi25O74F2•2H2O
 Khomyakovite Na12Sr3Ca6Fe3Zr3W(Si25O73)(O,OH,H2O)3(OH,Cl)2
 Manganokhomyakovite Na12Sr3Ca6Mn3Zr3W(Si25O73)(O,OH,H2O)3(OH,Cl)2
 Mogovidite Na9(Ca,Na)6Ca6Fe2Zr3[ ]Si25O72(CO3)(OH)4
 Oneillite Na15Ca3Mn3(Fe2+)3Zr3Nb(Si25O73)(O,OH,H2O)3(OH,Cl)2
 Raslakite Na15Ca3Fe3(Na,Zr)3Zr3(Si,Nb)(Si25O73)(OH,H2O)3(Cl,OH)
 Rastsvetaevite Na27K8Ca12Fe3Zr6Si52O144(O,OH,H2O)6Cl2
 Taseqite Na12Sr3Ca6Fe3Zr3NbSi25O73(O,OH,H2O)3Cl2
 Zirsilite-(Ce) (Na,[ ])12(Ce, Na)3Ca6Mn3Zr3Nb(Si25O73)(OH)3(CO3)•H2O
 Alluaivite Na19(Ca,Mn2+)6(Ti,Nb)3(Si3O9)2(Si10O28)2Cl•2H2O
 Andrianovite Na12(K,Sr,Ce)3Ca6Mn3Zr3Nb(Si25O73)(O,H2O,OH)5
 Aqualite (H3O)8(Na,K,Sr)5Ca6Zr3Si26O66(OH)9Cl
 Dualite Na30(Ca,Na,Ce,Sr)12(Na,Mn,Fe,Ti)6Zr3Ti3MnSi51O144(OH,H2O,Cl)9
 Labyrinthite (Na,K,Sr)35Ca12Fe3Zr6TiSi51O144(O,OH,H2O)9Cl3, Mills et al. (2009)

Subclass '9.D': inosilicates

Single chain inosilicates 
 Astrophyllite group
 Astrophyllite K2Na(Fe2+,Mn)7Ti2Si8O26(OH)4
 Magnesioastrophyllite K2Na[Na(Fe2+,Fe3+,Mn)Mg2]Ti2Si8O26(OH)4F
 Hydroastrophyllite (H3O,K)2Ca(Fe3+,Mn)5-6Ti2Si8O26(OH)4F
 Niobophyllite K2Na(Fe2+,Mn)7(Nb,Ti)2Si8O26(OH)4(F,O)
 Zircophyllite K2(Na,Ca)(Mn,Fe2+)7(Zr,Nb)2Si8O26(OH)4F
 Kupletskite K2Na(Mn,Fe2+)7(Ti,Nb)2Si8O26(OH)4F
 Kupletskite-(Cs) (Cs,K)2Na(Mn,Fe2+,Li)7(Ti,Nb)2Si8O26(OH)4F
 Niobokupletskite K2Na(Mn,Zn,Fe)7(Nb,Zr,Ti)2Si8O26(OH)4(O,F), Mills et al. (2009)
 Sapphirine supergroup
 Sapphirine group
 Khmaralite (Mg,Al,Fe)16(Al,Si,Be)12O40, Sapphirine (Mg,Al)8(Al,Si)6O20
 Aenigmatite group
 Aenigmatite (Na,Ca)4(Fe2+,Ti,Mg)12Si12O40, Krinovite NaMg2CrSi3O10, Wilkinsonite Na2(Fe2+)4(Fe3+)2Si6O20
 Rhoenite group
 Dorrite Ca2Mg2(Fe3+)4(Al,Fe3+)4Si2O20, Hogtuvaite (Ca,Na)2(Fe2+,Fe3+,Ti,Mg,Mn)6(Si,Be,Al)6O20, Makarochkinite Ca2(Fe2+)4Fe3+TiSi4BeAlO20, Rhonite Ca2(Mg,Fe2+,Fe3+,Ti)6(Si,Al)6O20, Serendibite Ca2(Mg,Al)6(Si,Al,B)6O20, Welshite Ca4Mg9Sb3O4[Si6Be3AlFe2O36]
 Surinamite (Mg,Fe2+)3Al4BeSi3O16, Mills et al. (2009)

Pyroxene supergroup 

 Orthopyroxene group
 Donpeacorite (Mn2+,Mg)Mg[SiO3]2, Enstatite MgSiO3, Ferrosilite, FeSiO3
 Clinopyroxene group
 Aegirine NaFe3+Si2O6, Augite (Ca,Na)(Mg,Fe2+,Al,Fe3+,Ti)[(Si,Al)2O6], Clinoenstatite MgSiO3, Clinoferrosilite Fe2+SiO3, Diopside CaMg[Si2O6], Esseneite CaFe3+[AlSiO6], Grossmanite CaTi3+AlSiO6, Hedenbergite CaFe2+[Si2O6], Jadeite Na(Al,Fe3+)[Si2O6], Jervisite (Na,Ca,Fe2+)(Sc,Mg,Fe2+)[Si2O6], Johannsenite CaMn2+[Si2O6], Kanoite Mn2+(Mg,Mn2+)[Si2O6], Kosmochlor NaCr[Si2O6], Kushiroite CaAl[Si2O6], Namansilite NaMn3+[Si2O6], Natalyite Na(V3+,Cr)[Si2O6], Petedunnite Ca(Zn,Mn2+,Mg,Fe2+)[Si2O6], Pigeonite (Mg,Fe2+,Ca)(Mg,Fe2+)Si2O6, Spodumene LiAlSi2O6

Multiple chain inosilicates 
Note: the amphibole subcommittee (CNMNC/ IMA) published many reports (IMA 1978 s.p., IMA 1997 s.p., IMA 2003 s.p., IMA 2012 s.p.), renaming and redefining many minerals. Working draft: rruff.info, mindat.org and mineralienatlas.de are not up to date yet.

Amphibole supergroup 

 w(OH, F, Cl)-dominant amphibole: calcic subgroup
 Cannilloite root name: fluoro-cannilloite CaCa2Mg4Al(Si5Al3)O22(OH)2 (1993-033, IMA 1997 s.p. Rd, IMA 2012 s.p. Rd Rn from cannilloite)
 Edenite root name: edenite Na[Ca2][Mg5][(OH)2|AlSi7O22] (1839, IMA 2012 s.p. Rd), ferro-edenite [Na][Ca2][(Fe2+)5][(OH)2|AlSi7O22] (1946, IMA 1997 s.p. Rd, IMA 2012 s.p. Rd), fluoro-edenite Na[Ca2][Mg5][(F,OH)2|AlSi7O22] (IMA 1994-059, IMA 2012 s.p. Rd)
 Hastingsite root name: hastingsite [Na][Ca2][(Fe2+)4Fe3+][(OH)2|Al2Si6O22] (1896, IMA 2012 s.p. Rd), magnesio-fluoro-hastingsite (Na,K)Ca2(Mg,Fe3+,Ti)5(Si,Al)8O22F2 (IMA 2005-002, IMA 2012 s.p. Rd Rn from fluoro-magnesiohastingsite), magnesio-hastingsite Na[Ca2][Mg4Fe3+][(OH)2|Al2Si6O22] (1928, IMA 1997 s.p. Rd, IMA 2012 s.p. Rd Rn from magnesiohastingsite), potassic-fluoro-hastingsite KCa2((Fe2+)2,Mg2,Fe3+)S5(Si6Al2)8O22F2 (IMA 2005-006, IMA 2012 s.p. Rd Rn from fluoro-potassichastingsite), potassic-chloro-hastingsite KCa2(Mg4Al)(Si6Al2)O22Cl2 (IMA 2005-007, IMA 2012 s.p. Rd Rn from chloro-potassicpargasite, syn. dashkesanite), potassic-magnesio-hastingsite (K,Na)Ca2(Mg,Fe2+,Fe3+,Al)5(Si,Al)8O22(OH,Cl)2 (IMA 2004-027b, IMA 2012 s.p. Rd Rn from potassic-magnesiohastingsite)
 Joesmithite PbCa2(Mg,Fe2+,Fe3+)5Si6Be2O22(OH)2 (1968, IMA 2012 s.p. Rd)
 Magnesio-hornblende root name: ferro-hornblende [Ca2][(Fe2+)4Al][(OH)2|AlSi7O22] (1930, IMA 1978 s.p., IMA 1997 s.p. Rn from ferro-hornblende, IMA 2012 s.p. Rd Rn from ferrohornblende),  magnesio-hornblende [Ca2][Mg4Al][(OH)2|AlSi7O22] (1965, IMA 1997 s.p. Rd, IMA 2012 s.p. Rd Rn from magnesiohornblende)
 Pargasite root name: chromio-pargasite (IMA 2011-023, IMA 2012 s.p. Rd Rn from ehimeite), ferro-pargasite [Na][Ca2][(Fe2+)4Al][(OH)2|Al2Si6O22] (1961, IMA 1997 s.p. Rd, IMA 2012 s.p. Rd Rn from ferropargasite), fluoro-pargasite NaCa2(Mg3Fe2+Al)5(Si6Al2O22)F2 (IMA 2003-050, IMA 2012 s.p. Rd Rn from fluoropargasite), pargasite [Na][Ca2][Mg4Al][(OH)2|Al2Si6O22] (1815, IMA 1997 s.p. Rd, IMA 2012 s.p. Rd), potassic-chloro-pargasite KCa2((Fe2+)3MgFe3+)(Si6Al2)S8O22Cl2 (IMA 2001-036, IMA 2012 s.p. Rd Rn from chloro-potassichastingsite), potassic-ferro-pargasite KCa2((Fe2+)4Al)Si6Al2O22(OH)2 (IMA 2007-053, IMA 2012 s.p. Rd Rn from potassic-ferropargasite), potassic-fluoro-pargasite (IMA 2009-091, IMA 2012 s.p. Rd Rn from fluoro-potassic-pargasite), potassic-pargasite [K][Ca2][Mg4Al][(OH)2|Al2Si6O22] (IMA 1994-046, IMA 2012 s.p. Rd Rn from potassicpargasite)
 Sadanagaite root name: potassic-ferro-ferri-sadanagaite [K][Ca2][(Fe2+)3(Fe3+)2][(OH)2|Al3Si5O22] (IMA 1997-035, IMA 2012 s.p. Rd Rn from potassic-ferrisadanagaite), potassic-ferro-sadanagaite KCa2Fe2+3(Al,Fe3+)2(Si5Al3)O22(OH)2 (IMA 1980-027, 2004 Rd, IMA 1997 s.p. Rd Rn from sadanagaite, IMA 2012 s.p. Rd Rn from potassicsadanagaite), potassic-sadanagaite (K,Na)Ca2(Mg,Fe2+,Al,Ti)5[(Si,Al)8O22] (IMA 1982-102, 2004 Rd, IMA 2003 s.p. Rn from magnesio-sadanagaite, IMA 2012 s.p. Rd Rn from potassic-magnesiosadanagaite), sadanagaite [Na][Ca2][Mg3Al2][(OH)2|Al3Si5O22] (1984, IMA 1997 s.p. Rd Rn from sadanagaite, IMA 2002-051, 2004 Rn from potassic-magnesiosadanagaite, IMA 2012 s.p. Rd Rn from magnesiosadanagaite) 
 Tremolite-actinolite root name: actinolite Ca2(Mg,Fe2+)5(Si8O22)(OH)2 (1794, IMA 2012 s.p. Rd), ferro-actinolite [Ca2][(Fe2+,Mg)5][(OH)2|Si8O22] (1946, IMA 1997 s.p. Rd, IMA 2012 s.p. Rd), tremolite [Ca2][Mg5][(OH)2|Si8O22] (1789, IMA 1997 s.p. Rd, IMA 2012 s.p. Rd)
 Tschermakite root name: tschermakite [Ca2][Mg3Fe3+Al][(OH)2|Al2Si6O22] (1945, IMA 1997 s.p. Rd, IMA 2012 s.p. Rd) 
 w(OH, F, Cl)-dominant amphibole: lithium subgroup
 Clino-holmquistite root name: clino-ferro-ferri-holmquistite ☐Li2((Fe3+)2(Fe2+)3)Si8O22(OH)2 (IMA 1997 s.p., 2001-066, IMA 2012 s.p. Rd Rn from ferri-clinoferroholmquistite)
 Holmquistite root name: ferro-holmquistite ☐(Li2(Fe2+)3Al2)Si8O22(OH)2 (IMA 2004-030, IMA 2012 s.p. Rd), holmquistite ☐(Li2Mg3Al2)Si8O22(OH)2 (1913, IMA 1997 s.p. Rd, IMA 2012 s.p. Rd)
 Pedrizite root name: ferri-pedrizite NaLi2((Fe3+)2Mg2Li)Si8O22(OH)2 (IMA 2001-032, IMA 2003 s.p. discredited, IMA 2012 s.p. Rd revalidated), ferro-ferri-pedrizite NaLi2((Fe3+)2(Fe2+)3)Si8O22(OH)2 (IMA 2003 s.p., IMA 2012 s.p. Rd Rn from sodic-ferro-ferripedrizite), ferro-fluoro-pedrizite NaLi2(Fe2+)2Al2Li)Si8O22F2 (IMA 2008-070, IMA 2012 s.p. Rd Rn from fluoro-sodic-ferropedrizite), fluoro-pedrizite NaLi2(Mg2Al2Li)Si8O22F2 (IMA 2004-002, IMA 2012 s.p. Rd Rn from fluoro-sodic-pedrizite)
 w(OH, F, Cl)-dominant amphibole: Mg-Fe-Mn subgroup
Anthophyllite root name: anthophyllite ☐Mg7Si8O22(OH)2 (1801, IMA 2012 s.p. Rd), ferro-anthophyllite ☐(Fe2+)7Si8O22(OH)2 (1821, IMA 1997 s.p. Rd, IMA 2012 s.p. Rd), proto-anthophyllite (Mg,Fe)7Si8O22(OH)2 (IMA 2001-065, IMA 2012 s.p. Rd), protoferro-anthophyllite (Fe2+,Mn2+)2(Fe2+,Mg)5(Si4O11)2(OH)2 (IMA 1986-006, IMA 2012 s.p. Rd), protomangano-ferro-anthophyllite (Mn2+,Fe2+)2(Fe2+,Mg)5(Si4O11)2(OH)2 (IMA 1986-007, IMA 2012 s.p. Rd)
 Gedrite root name: ferro-gedrite ☐(Fe2+)5Al2Si6Al2O22(OH)2 (1939, IMA 1978 s.p. Rn, IMA 1997 s.p. Rd, IMA 2012 s.p. Rd Rn from ferrogedrite), gedrite ☐Mg5Al2Si6Al2O22(OH)2 (1836, IMA 2012 s.p. Rd)
 Minerals: cummingtonite ☐Mg7Si8O22(OH)2 (1824, IMA 1997 s.p. Rd, IMA 2012 s.p. Rd), grunerite ☐(Fe2+)7Si8O22(OH)2 (1853, IMA 1997 s.p. Rd, IMA 2012 s.p. Rd) 
 w(OH, F, Cl)-dominant amphibole: sodic subgroup
 Arfvedsonite root name: arfvedsonite NaNa2((Fe2+)4Fe3+)Si8O22(OH)2 (1823, IMA 2012 s.p. Rd), magnesio-arfvedsonite NaNa2(Mg4Fe2+)Si8O22(OH)2 (1957, IMA 2012 s.p. Rd), magnesio-fluoro-arfvedsonite NaNa2(Mg,Fe2+)4Fe3+[Si8O22](F,OH)2 (IMA 1998-056, IMA 2012 s.p. Rd Rn from fluoro-magnesio-arfvedsonite), potassic-arfvedsonite KNa2(Fe2+)4Fe3+Si8O22(OH)2 (IMA 2003-043, IMA 2012 s.p. Rd), potassic-magnesio-fluoro-arfvedsonite KNa2(Mg4Fe3+)Si8O22F2 (IMA 1985-023, 2006 Rn from potassium fluor-magnesio-arfvedsonite, 2010 Rd, IMA 2012 s.p. Rd Rn from fluoro-potassic-magnesio-arfvedsonite)
 Eckermannite root name: eckermannite NaNa2(Mg4Al)Si8O22(OH)2 (1942, IMA 2012 s.p. Rd), mangano-ferri-eckermannite NaNa2(Mn2+)4(Fe3+,Al)Si8O22(OH)2 (1968-028, IMA 1997 s.p., IMA 2012 s.p. Rd Rn from kôzulite)
 Glaucophane root name: ferro-glaucophane ☐Na2((Fe2+)3Al2)Si8O22(OH)2 (1957, IMA 1997 s.p. Rd, IMA 2012 s.p. Rd Rn from ferroglaucophane), glaucophane ☐Na2(Mg3Al2)Si8O22(OH)2 (1963, IMA 1997 s.p. Rd, IMA 2012 s.p. Rd)
 Leakeite root name: ferri-fluoro-leakeite NaNa2(Mg2Fe3+2Li)Si8O22F2 (IMA 2009-085, IMA 2012 s.p. Rd Rn from fluoroleakeite), ferri-leakeite Na(NaLi)(Mg2(Fe3+)2Li)Si8O22(OH)2 (IMA 2001-069, IMA 2012 s.p. Rd Rn from ferriwhittakerite), ferro-ferri-fluoro-leakeite NaNa2((Fe2+)2(Fe3+)2Li)Si8O22F2 (IMA 1993-026, IMA 2012 s.p. Rd Rn from fluoro-ferroleakeite), fluoro-leakeite NaNa2(Mg2Al2Li)Si8O22F2 (IMA 2009-012, IMA 2012 s.p. Rd Rn from fluoro-aluminoleakeite), potassic-ferri-leakeite KNa2Mg2(Fe3+)2LiSi8O22(OH)2 (IMA 2001-049, IMA 2012 s.p. Rd Rn from potassicleakeite), potassic-leakeite KNa2(Mg2Al2Li)Si8O22(OH)2 (2002, IMA 2012 s.p. Rd), potassic-mangani-leakeite KNa2(Mg2Mn3+2Li)Si8O22(OH)2 (IMA 1992-032, IMA 2012 s.p. Rd Rn from kornite)
 Nybøite root name: ferro-ferri-nybøite NaNa2(Fe2+)3(Fe3+)2(Si7Al)O22(OH)2 (IMA 1997 s.p., IMA 2012 s.p. Rd Rn from ferric-ferronyboite), fluoro-nybøite NaNa2(Al2Mg3)(Si7Al)O22(F,OH)2 (IMA 2002-010, IMA 2012 s.p. Rd Rn from fluoronybøite), nybøite NaNa2(Mg3Al2)Si7AlO22(OH)2 (1981, IMA 1997 s.p. Rd, IMA 2012 s.p. Rd)
 Riebeckite root name: fluoro-riebeckite ☐Na2(Fe2+3Fe3+2)Si8O22F2 (1966, IMA 2012 s.p. Rd), magnesio-riebeckite ☐Na2[(Mg,Fe2+)3(Fe3+)2]Si8O22(OH)2 (1957, IMA 1997 s.p. Rd, IMA 2012 s.p. Rd), riebeckite ☐Na2((Fe2+)3(Fe3+)2)Si8O22(OH)2 (1888, IMA 1997 s.p. Rd, IMA 2012 s.p. Rd)
 w(OH, F, Cl)-dominant amphibole: sodic-calcic subgroup
 Barroisite root name: barroisite [CaNa][Mg3AlFe3+][(OH)2|AlSi7O22] (1922, IMA 1997 s.p. Rd, IMA 2012 s.p. Rd)
 Katophorite root name: ferri-fluoro-katophorite Na(NaCa)(Mg4Fe3+)(Si7Al)O22F2 (IMA 2012 s.p.), ferri-katophorite Na2Ca(Fe2+,Mg)4Fe3+(Si7Al)O22(OH)2 (IMA 1978 s.p., IMA 2012 s.p. Rd Rn from ferrikatophorite), ferro-katophorite Na(NaCa)(Fe2+4Al)(Si7Al)O22(OH)2 (1894, IMA 2012 s.p. Rd Rn), katophorite Na(NaCa)(Mg4Al)(Si7Al)O22(OH)2 (1894, IMA 1997 s.p. Rd, IMA 2012 s.p. Rd)
 Richterite root name: ferro-richterite Na[CaNa][(Fe2+)5][(OH)2|Si8O22] (1946, IMA 1997 s.p. Rd, IMA 2012 s.p. Rd Rn from ferrorichterite), fluoro-richterite Na(CaNa)Mg5[Si8O22]F2 (IMA 1992-020, IMA 2012 s.p. Rd Rn from fluororichterite), potassic-fluoro-richterite K[CaNa][Mg5][(F,OH)2|Si8O22] (IMA 1986-046, IMA 2004 s.p. Rn from potassium-fluorrichterite, IMA 2012 s.p. Rd Rn from fluoro-potassicrichterite), richterite Na[CaNa][Mg5][(OH)2|Si8O22] (1865, IMA 1997 s.p. Rd, IMA 2012 s.p. Rd)
 Taramite root name: ferro-taramite Na[CaNa][(Fe2+)3Al2][(OH)2|Al2Si6O22] (IMA 2006-023, IMA 2012 s.p. Rd Rn from aluminotaramite), fluoro-taramite Na2CaMg3Al2(Si6Al2)O22F2 (IMA 2006-025, IMA 2012 s.p. Rd Rn from fluoro-alumino-magnesiotaramite), potassic-ferro-ferri-taramite K(CaNa)(Fe2+3Fe3+2)(Si6Al2)O22(OH)2  (IMA 1964-003, IMA 1978 s.p. Rn from mboziite, IMA 1997 s.p. Rn from ferri-taramite, IMA 2012 s.p. Rd Rn from ferritaramite, Erratum 2013 Rd Rn from ferro-ferri-taramite), potassic-ferro-taramite K(CaNa)(Fe2+3Al2)(Si6Al2)O22(OH)2 (IMA 2007-015, IMA 2012 s.p. Rd Rn from potassic-aluminotaramite), taramite Na2CaMg3Al2(Si6Al2)O22(OH)2 (IMA 2006-024, IMA 2012 s.p. Rd Rn from alumino-magnesiotaramite)
 Winchite root name: ferri-winchite (☐,Na)(Na,Ca)2(Mg,Fe2+)4Fe3+[Si8O22](OH)2 (IMA 2004-034, IMA 2012 s.p. Rd Rn from ferriwinchite), ferro-winchite [CaNa][(Fe2+)4(Al,Fe3+)][(OH)2|Si8O22] (IMA 1978 s.p., IMA 1997 s.p. Rd, IMA 2012 s.p. Rd Rn from ferrowinchite), winchite [CaNa][Mg4(Al,Fe3+)][(OH)2|Si8O22] (1906, IMA 1997 s.p. Rd, IMA 2012 s.p. Rd)
 w(OH, F, Cl)-dominant amphibole: Na-Mg-Fe-Mn subgroup
 Ghoseite root name: ferri-ghoseite Na(NaMn2+)(Mg4Fe3+)Si8O22(OH)2 (IMA 2003-066, IMA 2012 s.p. Rd Rn from parvowinchite)
 w(O)-dominant amphibole group
 Kaersutite root name: ferri-kaersutite NaCa2(Mg3Fe3+Ti)(Si6Al2)O22O2 (IMA 2011-035, IMA 2012 s.p. Rd Rn from ferrikaersutite), kaersutite NaCa2(Mg4Ti)(Si6Al2)O23(OH) (IMA 1997 s.p., IMA 2012 s.p. Rd)
 Minerals: mangani-dellaventuraite NaNa2(Mg2,Mn3+,Li,Ti)Si8O22O2 (IMA 2003-061, IMA 2012 s.p. Rd Rn from dellaventuraite), mangano-mangani-ungarettiite NaNa2((Mn2+)2(Mn3+)3)Si8O22O2 (IMA 1994-004, IMA 2012 s.p. Rd Rn from ungarettiite)

Subclass '9.E': phyllosilicates 
 
 :Category:Clay minerals group
 :Category:Medicinal clay
 :Category:Mica group
 :Category:Serpentine group/ Kaolinite-Serpentine group
 :Category:Smectite group/ Montmorillonite group
 Pyrophyllite-Talc group
 Chlorite group: Clinochlore, Nimite, Pennantite, Baileychlore, Cookeite, Donbassite, Gonyerite, Odinite, Sudoite, Orthochamosite

Subclass '9.F': tectosilicates

Tectosilicates without zeolitic H2O 

 :Category:Quartz varieties
 Feldspar family
 Feldspathoid family
Sodalite group
Helvine group
 :Category:Cancrinite group

Tectosilicates with zeolitic H2O 
 Category:Zeolite group
 Alflarsenite NaCa2Be3Si4O13(OH)•2H2O
 Zeolites with T5O10 Units – fibrous zeolites
 Natrolite subgroup
 Gonnardite (Na,Ca)2(Si,Al)5O10·3H2O, Mesolite Na2Ca2Si9Al6O30·8H2O, Natrolite Na2Al2Si3O10·2H2O, Paranatrolite Na2Al2Si3O10·3H2O, Scolecite CaAl2Si3O10·3H2O
Tetranatrolite? Na2[Al2Si3O10]•2H2O, Thomsonite-Sr (Sr,Ca)2Na[Al5Si5O20]•7H2O, Thomsonite-Ca NaCa2Al5Si5O20•6H2O, Kalborsite K6Al4Si6BO20(OH)4Cl, Edingtonite BaAl2Si3O10•4H2O
 Chains of single connected 4-membered rings
 Ammonioleucite (NH4,K)AlSi2O6, Leucite KAlSi2O6, Analcime NaAlSi2O6•H2O, Hsianghualite Ca3Li2Be3(SiO4)3F2, Lithosite K6Al4Si8O25•H2O, Pollucite (Cs,Na)2Al2Si4O12•H2O, Wairakite CaAl2Si4O12•2H2O, Laumontite CaAl2Si4O12•4H2O, Yugawaralite CaAl2Si6O16•4H2O, Roggianite Ca2[Be(OH)2Al2Si4O13]•2.5H2O, Goosecreekite CaAl2Si6O16•5H2O, Montesommaite (K,Na)9Al9Si23O64•10H2O, Partheite Ca2Al4Si4O15(OH)2•4H2O
 Chains of doubly connected 4-membered rings
 Amicite K2Na2Al4Si4O16•5H2O, Garronite Na2Ca5Al12Si20O64•27H2O, Gobbinsite (Na2,Ca)2K2Al6Si10O32•12H2O, Gismondine Ca2Al4Si4O16•9H2O, Harmotome (Ba,Na,K)(1-2)(Si,Al)8O16•6H2O, Phillipsite-Na (Na,K,Ca)(1-2)(Si,Al)8O16•6H2O, Phillipsite-Ca (Ca,K,Na)(1-2)(Si,Al)8O16•6H2O, Phillipsite-K (K,Na,Ca)(1-2)(Si,Al)8O16•6H2O, Merlinoite (K,Ca,Na,Ba)7Si23Al9O64•23H2O, Mazzite-Mg K2CaMg2(Al,Si)36O72•28H2O, Mazzite-Na Na8Al8Si28O72•30H2O, Perlialite K8Tl4Al12Si24O72•20H2O, Boggsite NaCa2(Al5Si19O48)•17H2O, Paulingite-Ca (Ca,K,Na,Ba)5[Al10Si35O84]•34H2O, Paulingite-K (K2,Ca,Na2,Ba)5Al10Si35O90•45H2O, Paulingite-Na (Na2,K2,Ca,Ba)5Al10Si35O90•45H2O
 Chains of 6-membered rings – tabular zeolites
 Gmelinite-Ca (Ca,Na2)Al2Si4O12•6H2O, Gmelinite-K (K,Na,Ca)6(Al7Si17O48)•22H2O, Gmelinite-Na (Na2,Ca)Al2Si4O12•6H2O, Chabazite-K (K2,Ca,Na2,Mg)[Al2Si4O12]•6H2O, Chabazite-Ca (Ca0.5,Na,K)4[Al4Si8O24]•12H2O, Chabazite-Na (Na2,K2,Ca,Mg)[Al2Si4O12]•6H2O, Chabazite-Sr (Sr,Ca,K2,Na2)[Al2Si4O12]•6H2O, Herschelite? (Na,Ca,K)AlSi2O6•3H2O, Willhendersonite KCaAl3Si3O12•5H2O, Levyne-Ca (Ca,Na2,K2)Al2Si4O12•6H2O, Levyne-Na (Na2,Ca,K2)Al2Si4O12•6H2O, Bellbergite (K,Ba,Sr)2Sr2Ca2(Ca,Na)4Al18Si18O72•30H2O, Erionite-Ca (Ca,K2,Na2)2[Al4Si14O36]•15H2O, Erionite-K (K2,Ca,Na2)2[Al4Si14O36]•15H2O, Erionite-Na (Na2,K2,Ca)2[Al4Si14O36]•15H2O, Wenkite Ba4Ca6(Si,Al)20O39(OH)2(SO4)3•nH2O (?), Offretite (K2,Ca,Mg)2.5Al5Si13O36•15H2O, Faujasite-Ca (Ca,Na2,Mg)3.5[Al7Si17O48]•32H2O, Faujasite-Mg (Mg,Na2,Ca)3.5[Al7Si17O48]•32H2O, Faujasite-Na (Na2,Ca,Mg)3.5[Al7Si17O48]•32H2O, Maricopaite Pb7Ca2(Si,Al)48O100•32H2O, Mordenite (Ca,Na2,K2)Al2Si10O24•7H2O, Dachiardite-Ca (Ca,Na2,K2)5Al10Si38O96•25H2O, Dachiardite-Na (Na2,Ca,K2)4Al4Si20O48•13H2O, Epistilbite CaAl2Si6O16•5H2O, Ferrierite-K (K,Na)2Mg(Si,Al)18O36•9H2O, Ferrierite-Mg (Mg,Na,K)2Mg(Si,Al)18O36•9H2O, Ferrierite-Na (Na,K)2Mg(Si,Al)18O36•9H2O, Bikitaite Li2[Al2Si4O12]•2H2O
 Chains of T10O20 tetrahedra
 Clinoptilolite-Na (Na,K,Ca)(2-3)Al3(Al,Si)2Si13O36•12H2O, Clinoptilolite-K (Na,K,Ca)(2-3)Al3(Al,Si)2Si13O36•12H2O, Clinoptilolite-Ca (Ca,Na,K)(2-3)Al3(Al,Si)2Si13O36•12H2O, Heulandite-Ba (Ba,Ca,K,Na,Sr)5Al9Si27O72•22H2O, Heulandite-Ca (Ca,Na)(2-3)Al3(Al,Si)2Si13O36•12H2O, Heulandite-K (K,Na,Ca)(2-3)Al3(Al,Si)2Si13O36•12H2O, Heulandite-Na (Na,Ca)(2-3)Al3(Al,Si)2Si13O36•12H2O, Heulandite-Sr (Sr,Na,Ca)(2-3)Al3(Al,Si)2Si13O36•12H2O, Stilbite-Ca NaCa4[Al8Si28O72]•H2O, Stilbite-Na Na3Ca3[Al8Si28O72]•H2O, Barrerite (Na,K,Ca)2Al2Si7O18•6H2O, Stellerite CaAl2Si7O18•7H2O, Brewsterite-Ba (Ba,Sr)Al2Si6O16•5H2O, Brewsterite-Sr (Sr,Ba)Al4Si12O32•10H2O
 Other rare zeolites
 Terranovaite (Na,Ca)8(Si68Al12)O160•29H2O, Gottardiite Na3Mg3Ca5Al19Si117O272•93H2O, Lovdarite K2Na6Be4Si14O36•9H2O, Gaultite Na4Zn2Si7O18•5H2O, Chiavennite CaMnBe2Si5O13(OH)2•2H2O, Tschernichite (Ca,Na)(Si6Al2)O16•(4-8)H2O, Mutinaite Na3Ca4Si85Al11O192•60H2O, Tschortnerite Ca4(Ca,Sr,K,Ba)3Cu3(OH)8[Si12Al12O48]•H2O, Thornasite Na12Th3[Si8O19]4•18H2O, Direnzoite NaK6MgCa2(Al13Si47O120)•36H2O
 Unclassified zeolites
 Cowlesite CaAl2Si3O10•(5-6)H2O, Mountainite (Ca,Na2,K2)2Si4O10•3H2O

Subclass: Germanates

See also

References 

 
 
 
 
 

Minerals
Mineralogy